This is a list of Crystal Palace F.C. seasons in English and European football, from their first official season in 1905–06 up to the 2021–22 season. It details the club's achievements in senior league and cup competitions, European competitions and the top scorers for each season. The list of top scorers also chronicles how the club's scoring records have progressed throughout its history.

Key

Key to divisions
SL Div 2 = Southern League Second Division
SL Div 1 = Southern League First Division
Div 1 = Football League First Division
Div 2 = Football League Second Division
Div 3 = Football League Third Division
Div 3S = Football League Third Division South
Div 4 = Football League Fourth Division
Prem = Premier League
Champ = Football League Championship

Key to positions and symbols
  = Winners
  = Runners-up
  = Promoted
  = Relegated

Key to rounds
GS = Group stage
R1 = First round, etc.
QF = Quarter-finals
SF = Semi-finals
SF/S = Semi-finals – Southern Section
RU = Runners-up
RU/S = Runners-up Southern Section
W = Winners

Seasons

Footnotes

References

Sources
Soccerbase
Football Club History Database
Football Site

Seasons
 
English football club seasons